Francesco Barozzi (died 1471) was a professor and a Roman Catholic prelate who served as Bishop of Treviso (1466–1471).

Biography
Francesco Barozzi was born in Italy.
He taught law at the University of Padua from 1440 to 1466.

On 17 April 1466, he was appointed during the papacy of Pope Paul II as Bishop of Treviso.
On 6 July 1466, he was consecrated bishop by Gautier de Forcalquier, Bishop of Gap, with Placido Pavanello, Bishop of Torcello, and Nicolas de Crucibus, Bishop of Hvar, serving as co-consecrators. 
He served as Bishop of Treviso until his death in 1471.

References

External links and additional sources
  (for Chronology of Bishops) 
  (for Chronology of Bishops) 
 

15th-century Italian Roman Catholic bishops
Bishops appointed by Pope Paul II
1471 deaths
Francesco
Academic staff of the University of Padua